Hawke Bay, formerly named Hawke's Bay, is a large bay on the east coast of the North Island of New Zealand, surrounded by the Hawke's Bay region.

Captain James Cook, sailing in HMS Endeavour, entered the bay on 12 October 1769.  After exploring it, he named it for Sir Edward Hawke, First Lord of the Admiralty, on 15 October 1769, describing it as some 13 leagues (about ) across. Hawke had decisively defeated the French at the Battle of Quiberon Bay in 1759.

This part of the New Zealand coast is subject to tectonic uplift, with the land being raised out of the sea. For this reason, the coastal land in this area has significant marine deposits, with both marine and land dinosaur fossils having been found inland. The Napier earthquake of 3 February 1931 resulted in several parts of the seabed close to the city of Napier being raised above sea level. Because the central mountain ranges come close to the coast at the north end of the bay, much of the bay's northerly coastline has deeply eroded tablelands that end in steep seaside cliffs which descend to narrow beaches.

Despite the bay being renamed Hawke Bay, without an apostrophe, the region surrounding it continues to bear the former name of Hawke's Bay. Several medium-sized towns are located in the immediate surrounds of the bay, including Wairoa at the mouth of the Wairoa River and its flood plain in the north, the so-called 'twin cities' of Napier and Hastings in the south, and the town of Havelock North slightly further inland. Napier Port serves as the main export port for the region, and is the second largest in the North Island by tonnage.

References

External links 

Landforms of the Hawke's Bay Region
Bays of New Zealand